Susan Palmer-Komar (born January 27, 1967 in Collingwood, Ontario) is a Canadian racing cyclist. She represented Canada at the 1996 Summer Olympics and 2004 Summer Olympics in the women's road race and in 2004 also in the women's time trial. She also rode at the 1998, 2000, 2001, 2002, 2003, 2004, 2005 and 2006 UCI Road World Championships. She now teaches elementary school students in Hamilton, Ontario.

Palmarès

1992
2nd Canadian National Road Race Championships

1995
2nd Canadian National Road Race Championships
2nd Canadian National Time Trial Championships

1996
1st  Canadian National Road Race Championships

1997
3rd Canadian National Road Race Championships

2002
2nd Road race, Commonwealth Games, Rivington

2003
3rd Canadian National Road Race Championships
2nd Waalse Pijl (F) (BEL)

2004
3rd Prologue, Redlands Bicycle Classic, Mt Rubidoux (USA)
2nd Stage 3, Redlands Bicycle Classic (USA)
1st Circuit National Féminin de Saint-Amand-Montrond (FRA)
1st  Canadian National Time Trial Championships

2005
1st  Canadian National Time Trial Championships
3rd Canadian National Road Race Championships

References

External links
 
 profile at Procyclingstats.com

1967 births
Living people
Sportspeople from Hamilton, Ontario
Canadian female cyclists
Cyclists at the 2002 Commonwealth Games
McMaster University alumni
Cyclists at the 2004 Summer Olympics
Cyclists at the 1996 Summer Olympics
Olympic cyclists of Canada
Commonwealth Games medallists in cycling
Commonwealth Games silver medallists for Canada
Medallists at the 2002 Commonwealth Games